Hirne is an urban-type settlement in Khartsyzk Municipality (district) in Donetsk Oblast of eastern Ukraine. Population update:

Demographics
Native language as of the Ukrainian Census of 2001:
 Ukrainian 8.39%
 Russian 90.73%
 Romani 0.39%
 Belarusian 0.08%
 Armenian 0.05%
 Greek 0.03%

References

Urban-type settlements in Donetsk Raion